Adam Edström (born 12 October 2000) is a Swedish professional ice hockey forward for Rögle BK of the Swedish Hockey League (SHL) while under contract with the New York Rangers of the National Hockey League (NHL). He was selected by the Rangers in the sixth round of the 2019 NHL Entry Draft with the 161st pick of the draft.

Playing career
In 2018–19 he split the season between Mora IK of the SHL and Mora IK J20 of the J20 SuperElit league.  He registered one assist without scoring a goal in 15 games for Mora IK. Edström joined Rögle BK the following season and established himself in the SHL through three seasons with the club.

On 17 May 2022, Edström was signed by draft club, the New York Rangers, to a three-year, entry-level contract. He was on the Rangers' 2022–23 training camp roster but was returned to Rögle BK.

Career statistics

References

External links

2000 births
Living people
Mora IK players
New York Rangers draft picks
Rögle BK players
Sportspeople from Karlstad
Swedish ice hockey forwards